Richard Birde (died after 1595), of Winchester, Hampshire, was an English politician.

He was a Member (MP) of the Parliament of England for Winchester in 1571. He was Mayor of Winchester 1571–2, 1577–8 and 1584–5.

References

16th-century births
Year of death missing
English MPs 1571
Mayors of Winchester
Politicians from Winchester